was a district located in Mie Prefecture, Japan.

As of 2003, the district had an estimated population of 7,051 and a density of 88.27 persons per km2. The total area was 79.88 km2.

Towns and villages
 Seki

Merger
 On January 11, 2005, the town of Seki merged into the expanded city of Kameyama. Suzuka District was dissolved as a result of this merger.

Former districts of Mie Prefecture